Waitman Wade Beorn is a historian who studies the Holocaust in Eastern Europe. He is currently a Senior Lecturer in History at Northumbria University in Newcastle, UK. Previously, he served as the Louis and Frances Blumkin Professor of Holocaust and Genocide Studies at the University of Nebraska-Omaha.  From 2015 to 2016, he was the executive director of the Virginia Holocaust Museum in Richmond, Va.

Early life
Waitman Wade Beorn is a native of Richmond, Virginia.  He attended the United States Military Academy at West Point as a member of the Class of 2000.  Dr. Beorn was commissioned as a 2LT (Armor branch) and served in the 1st Squadron, 10th United States Cavalry (Buffalo Soldiers) in the 4th Infantry Division at Ft. Hood, Texas and during Operation Iraqi Freedom, 2003–2004.  After leaving the Army, he attended graduate school at the University of North Carolina-Chapel Hill, earning his PhD in history in 2011.

Research

Monographs 
Dr. Beorn's first book, Marching into Darkness: The Wehrmacht and the Holocaust in Belarus, explored the local participation of the German Army in the Holocaust,  It looked at a series of case studies of units in the Generalbezirk Weißruthenien during World War II.  It argued for a progression of ever-increasing complicity by the Wehrmacht in genocide.  His second book, The Holocaust in Eastern Europe: At the Epicenter of the Final Solution, is a general survey of the Holocaust in the East.  He is currently finishing a book on the Janowska concentration camp and the Holocaust in Lviv.

Digital Humanities Work 
Beorn is a founding member of the Holocaust Geographies Collaborative, an interdisciplinary group of scholars interested in exploring how a spatial and digital approach can better inform our understanding of the Holocaust. He is a digital humanist who integrates mapping, modeling, and social network analyses into his work.

Awards and Fellowships

 Thomas J. Wilson Prize for Best First Book from Harvard University Press (2014)
 Harry Frank Guggenheim Dissertation Fellowship (2010-2011)
 National Endowment for the Humanities Summer Stipend FT-259641-18 "Between the Wires: The Janowska Camp and the Holocaust in Lviv," 2019
 USC Shoah Foundation Archive Teaching Fellow, 2013-4
 National Science Foundation (NSF) Grant "Collaborative Research - Holocaust Historical GIS," Award # 0820501 (with Tim Cole, Simone Gigliotti, Alberto Giordano, Anna Holian, Paul Jaskot, Anne Knowles, Marc Masurovsky, and Erik Steiner), 2008-2011
 Fulbright Fellowship, Germany (2008-2009)

Selected works
Beorn, Waitman Wade. Marching into Darkness: The Wehrmacht and the Holocaust in Belarus. Cambridge: Harvard University Press, 2014.
Beorn, Waitman Wade. The Holocaust in Eastern Europe: At the Epicenter of the Final Solution. London: Bloomsbury Academic Press, 2018.
Beorn, Waitman Wade. "Understanding the Holocaust in the Context of the Second World War." In Understanding and Teaching the Holocaust, edited by Laura Hilton and Avinoam Patt. Madison WI: Wisconsin University Press, 2020.
Beorn, Waitman Wade. "All the Other Neighbors: Communal Genocide in Eastern Europe." In The Wiley Blackwell Companion to the Holocaust, edited by Hilary Earl and Simone Gigliotti, 153–72. Hoboken, MJ: Wiley and Sons, 2020.
Beorn, Waitman Wade. "Unraveling Janowska: Excavating an Understudied Camp through Spatial Testimonies." In Beyond "Ordinary Men": Christopher R. Browning and Holocaust Historiography edited by Thomas Pegelow Kaplan, Jürgen Matthäus and Mark W.  Hornburg, 250–68. Paderborn: Verlag Ferdinand Schöningh, 2019.
Beorn, Waitman Wade. "Safe Simulations? Best Practices for Exercising History in the Classroom." In Teaching Genocide: Insights and Advice from Secondary Teachers and Professors, edited by Samuel Totten, 125–32. New York: Rowman Littlefield, 2018.
Beorn, Waitman Wade. "Bodily Conquest: Sexual Violence in the Nazi East." In Mass Violence in Nazi-Occupied Europe, edited by Alex J. Kay and David Stahel, 195–215. Bloomington, Indiana USA: Indiana University Press, 2018.
Beorn, Waitman Wade. "Killing on the Ground and in the Mind: The Spatialities of Genocide in the East." In Geographies of the Holocaust, edited by Anne Kelly  Knowles, Tim Cole and Alberto Giordano, 89–118. Bloomington, IN: Indiana University Press, 2014.

References

Living people
Historians of the Holocaust
Year of birth missing (living people)
People from Richmond, Virginia
Academics of Northumbria University
University of Nebraska Omaha faculty
University of North Carolina at Chapel Hill alumni
United States Military Academy alumni